The sport of football in the Seychelles is run by the Seychelles Football Federation. The association administers the national football team, as well as the Premier League.

League system

Seychelles stadiums

References